Koopman is a Dutch occupational surname that means "merchant". The spelling Coopman is more common in West Flanders. Notable people with the surname include:

Koopman
 Bernard Koopman (1900–1981), French-born American mathematician
 known for a.o.: Koopman operator, Koopman–von Neumann classical mechanics, Pitman-Koopman theorem
 Bertha Koopman (married name Bertha Frensel Wegener; 1874–1953), Dutch composer and music educator
 Bram Koopman (1917–2008), Dutch Labour Party politician
 Elias Bernard Koopman (1860–1929), founder of the American Mutoscope and Biograph Company
 Elisabeth Koopman (1647–1693), German astronomer with Dutch parents, wife of Johannes Hevelius
 12625 Koopman, a Main Belt asteroid named after her
 Gionne Koopman (born 1991), South African cricketer
 Hilda Koopman (born 1947), Dutch-American linguist
 (1790–1855), Dutch vice-admiral
 Karl Koopman (1920–1997), American zoologist 
 Koopman's anole, Koopman's mountain mouse, Koopman's Pipistrelle and Koopman's rat are named for him 
 Martin Koopman (born 1956), Dutch football defender and manager
 Ody Koopman (1902–1949), Dutch tennis player, brother of Toto
 Pim Koopman (1953–2009), Dutch musician and member of Kayak
 Rinse Koopman (1770–1826), Dutch Mennonite teacher and minister
 Ton Koopman (born 1944), Dutch conductor, organist and harpsichordist
 Toto Koopman (1908–1991), Dutch model and anti-fascist spy during World War II, sister of Ody
 Willi Koopman (born 1944), Dutch actress
 Gerrit Koopman (1905-1969), American Businessman and Farmer

Coopman
 Jean-Pierre Coopman (born 1946), Flemish boxer
 Sander Coopman (born 1995), Flemish footballer
 (1852–1915), Flemish poet

See also
 Kaufmann, German equivalent
 Koopmans, Dutch surname

References

Dutch-language surnames
Occupational surnames